Adolf Prokop (born 2 February 1939) was a football referee from East Germany.

He is mostly known for supervising two matches in the FIFA World Cup, one in 1978 and one in 1982. He was also active at the 1976 Olympics, UEFA Euro 1984 and refereed the 1984 European Cup Winners' Cup Final.

References

External links
Profile at WorldFootball.net

1939 births
People from Trutnov District
People from Sudetenland
German football referees
FIFA World Cup referees
1982 FIFA World Cup referees
1978 FIFA World Cup referees
Olympic football referees
UEFA Euro 1980 referees
UEFA Euro 1984 referees
Stasi officers
Living people